The 1952 USC Trojans football team represented the University of Southern California (USC) in the 1952 college football season. In their second year under head coach Jess Hill, the Trojans compiled a 10–1 record (6–0 against conference opponents), won the Pacific Coast Conference championship, and outscored their opponents by a combined total of 254 to 47.

The Trojans finished the season ranked #4 in the final United Press Coaches Poll and #5 in the final AP Poll. They faced five ranked opponents during the 1952 season and won four of those games: a 10–0 victory over #4 California on October 25; a 33–0 victory over #17 Washington on November 15; a 14–12 victory over #3 UCLA on November 22; a 9–0 loss to Notre Dame on November 29; and a 7–0 victory over Wisconsin in the 1953 Rose Bowl. USC's victory in the Rose Bowl was the first for the Pacific Coast Conference after seven consecutive losses to the representatives of the Big Ten Conference.

Jim Sears led the team in passing with 51 of 105 passes completed for 739 yards, eight touchdowns and eight interceptions. Leon Sellers led the team in rushing with 103 carries for 386 yards and two touchdowns. Leon Clarke was the leading receiver with 25 catches for 372 yards and three touchdowns.

Eight Trojans received honors from the Associated Press (AP), United Press (UP), or International News Service (INS) on the 1952 All-Pacific Coast Conference football team: back Jim Sears (AP-1 [safety]; INS-1; UP-1 [halfback]); back Lindon Crow (AP-1 [defensive back]); defensive end Bob Hooks, USC (AP-1); tackle Robert Van Doren, USC (AP-1 [defensive tackle]; INS-1; UP-1); guard Elmer Willhoite, USC (AP-1 [defensive guard]; INS-1; UP-1); guard Marv Goux, USC (INS-1); center Lou Welsh, USC (AP-1); and linebacker George Timberlake, USC (AP-1). Sears and Wilhoite were also consensus All-Americans.

Schedule

Players
The following players were members of the 1952 USC Trojans football team.
 Charley Ane, 6'2", 254 pounds, right guard (offense and defense), #60, Honolulu, Hawaii (All-PCC UP-2)
 Al Barry, 6'2", 221 pounds, right tackle (offense and defense), #79, Los Angeles (Honorable-mention All-PCC AP)
 George Bozanic, 6'2", 207 pounds, quarterback (offense) and linebacker (defense), #38, Lander, Wyoming
 Rudy Bukich, 6'1", 186 pounds, left halfback (offense), #18, St. Louis, Missouri (Outstanding Player, 1953 Rose Bowl)
 Al Carmichael, 6'0", 185 pounds, right halfback (offense), #21, Hawthorne, California (All-PCC UP-2)
 Bob Cox, 5'8", 183 pounds, right guard (offense), #62, Pasadena, California
 Lindon Crow, 6'1", 191 pounds, right halfback (offense and defense), #36, Corcoran, California
 Aramis Dandoy, 5'11", 182 pounds, right halfback (offense), #27, Torrance, California
 Ed Fouch, 6'3", 229 pounds, tackle (offense and defense), #49, Santa Ana, California
 Marvin Goux, 5'10", 181 pounds, linebacker (defense), #20, Santa Barbara, California (All-PCC UP-3
 Harold Han, 5'9", 189 pounds, fullback and safety, #46, Honolulu, Hawaii
 Bill Hattig, 5'9", 164 pounds, left end (offense and defense), #86, Los Angeles
 Addison Hawthorne, 5'10", 194 pounds, fullback and safety, #23, Los Angeles
 Bob Hooks, 6'3", 206 pounds, right end (defense), #58, Los Angeles (AP All-Coast Defensive Team)
 Des Koch, 6'1", 207 pounds, tailback (offense), #43, Shelton, Washington (nation's leading punter with 43.4 yard average)
 Ron Miller, 6'4", 204 pounds, left end (offense), #88, Los Angeles
 Tom Nickoloff, 6'3", 218 pounds, right end (offense), #80, Los Angeles
 Dick Nunis, 6'0", 182 pounds, right halfback (defense), #26, Los Angeles
 Dick Petty, 6'0", 190 pounds, center (offense) and end (defense), #54, Los Angeles
 Bob Peviani, 6'1", 212 pounds, left guard (defense), #66, Los Angeles (John Dye Memorial Award as the "outstanding lineman")
 Jim Psaltis, 6'1", 186 pounds, left halfback, safety (defense), #37, Oakland, California (AP All-Coast Defensive team; led nation with nine interceptions)
 Ed Pucci, 6'0", 209 pounds, left guard (offense), #64, Canton, Ohio
 Bill Riddle, 6'0", 190 pounds, quarterback (offense), linebacker (defense), #52, El Centro, California
 Jim Sears, 5'9", 165 pounds, halfback (offense) and safety (defense), #32 (won W. J. Voit Memorial Trophy; nation's leading punt returner with 15.9 yard average; led the Trojans in total yardage and passes completed; first-team All-American selection by AP, INS, NEA, and Look magazine)
 Leon Sellers, 6'0", 194 pounds, fullback (offense), #44, Upland, California
 Don Stillwell, 6'0", 183 pounds, left end (offense), #84, San Francisco
 Sam "The Toe" Tsagalakis
 George Timberlake, 6'0", 207 pounds, linebacker (defense), #56, Long Beach, California (AP All-Coast Defensive Team)
 Bob Van Doren, 6'3-1/2", 203 pounds, right tackle (defense) and defensive captain, #75, San Diego (UP All-PCC first team; UP All-American third team)
 Chuck Weeks, 6'2", 219 pounds, right tackle (offense), #72, Columbus, Ohio
 Harry Welsh, 5'10", 168 pounds, halfback (defense), #25, Akron, Ohio 
 Lou Welsh, 6'1", 193 pounds, center (offense), #50, Ontario, California(selected as USC's "most inspirational" player)
 Elmer Wilhoite, left guard (offense and defense), 6'1", 217 pounds, #73 (first-team All-American pick by UP, INS, NEA, Look magazine, and Collier's Weekly

Coaching staff and other personnel
 Head coach: Jess Hill
 Assistant coaches: Mel Hein (line); Joe Muha (backfield); Don Clark (line); Bill Fisk (ends); Walter Hargesheimer (backs); Jess Mortensen (freshman coach)
 Senior manager: John Broadbent
 Yell Kings: Al Gallion, Bob Arnett, Jim Strode, Larry Stone, and Dick Chapman

References

USC
USC Trojans football seasons
Pac-12 Conference football champion seasons
Rose Bowl champion seasons
USC Trojans football